The Hahnenmoos Pass (German: Hahnenmoospass) is a mountain pass of the Bernese Alps. The Hahnenmoos Pass is the lowest pass between the Engstligental, to the east, and the upper Simmental, to the west.

The track forms part of the Alpine Pass Route, a long-distance hiking trail across Switzerland between Sargans and Montreux. Although a road leads to the pass from Adelboden, the pass can not be traversed by car.

In winter the pass is part  of a ski area. The Berghotel Hahnenmoospass is a hotel and restaurant that is located at the summit of the pass and is open in both summer and winter.

See also
List of highest paved roads in Switzerland
List of mountain passes in Switzerland

References

External links

Hahnenmoos Pass on Via Alpina web site
Hahnenmoospass on Hikr web site

Mountain passes of Switzerland
Mountain passes of the Alps
Mountain passes of the canton of Bern